Hachasu (also Romanized as Hāchāsū; also known as Hāchehsū and Hācheh Sū) is a village in Hulasu Rural District of the Central District of Shahin Dezh County, West Azerbaijan province, Iran. At the 2006 National Census, its population was 1,522 in 399 households. The following census in 2011 counted 1,655 people in 464 households. The latest census in 2016 showed a population of 1,416 people in 462 households; it was the largest village in its rural district.

References 

Shahin Dezh County

Populated places in West Azerbaijan Province

Populated places in Shahin Dezh County